The 2007 Thailand League Division 1 was played in two groups of 12 teams. The top two teams of each group were promoted and the bottom five teams of each group were relegated as the Thai football league system was in the process of being restructured.

Customs Department were crowned champions after winning the end of season championship finals played between the promoted sides.

Member clubs in Group A

Customs Depart
Coke-Bangpra
Rattana Bundit
Khonkaen (move from 2006 Pro League 1 11th)
Raj-Vithi
Surat Thani (move from 2006 Pro League 1 7th)
Thai Airways (from 2005–06 Khǒr Royal Cup (ถ้วย ข.) Runner-up)
Narathiwat (move from 2006 Pro League 1 5th)
Air Force Training College
Sakon Nakhon (move from 2006 Pro League 1 13th)
Bangkok Bravo (move from 2006 Pro League 1 9th)
Ratchaburi (Promoted from 2006 Pro League 2 Champion)

Member clubs in Group B

Chula-Sinthana (Promoted from 2006 Thailand Division 2 League Champion)
Samut Songkhram(Promoted from 2006 Pro League 2 Runner-up)
Royal Thai Air Force
Chanthaburi (move from 2006 Pro League 1 8th)
Phitsanulok (move from 2006 Pro League 1 6th)
Sriracha
Nakhon Sawan (move from 2006 Pro League 1 4th)
Bangkok North Central ASSN
Nakhon Ratchasima (move from 2006 Pro League 1 10th)
Sisaket (move from 2006 Pro League 1 12th)
Chachoengsao (move from 2006 Pro League 1 14th)
Royal Thai Marine (from 2005–06 Khǒr Royal Cup (ถ้วย ข.) Champion)

Teams

Group A

Group B

Final league standings

Group A

Group B

Playoffs

Third place match

First Leg

Second Leg

Coke-Bangpra won 4–1 on aggregate.

Final
First Leg

Second Leg

Customs Department	 won 1 – 4 on Penalties after Two Leg Draw 6–6 on aggregate.

See also
 2007 Thailand Premier League
 2007 Thailand League Division 2

References

Thailand 2007 RSSSF

Thai League 2 seasons
2
Thai
Thai